Cedric Thompson (born February 10, 1993) is a former American football safety. He played college football at Minnesota.

Early life
Born in Los Angeles, Thompson grew up in Bombay Beach, California. He has two siblings, brother Tedric and sister Cedrinae. He became one of the primary subjects of the 2011 documentary Bombay Beach directed by Alma Har'el. He later cited boredom in Bombay Beach as his inspiration for pro football.

Professional career

Miami Dolphins
He was drafted by the Miami Dolphins in the fifth round of the 2015 NFL Draft.

New England Patriots
On January 12, 2016, the Patriots signed Thompson to their practice squad after he was not offered a futures contract with Miami. On January 26, 2016, Thompson signed a futures contract with the New England Patriots.

On August 21, 2016, Thompson was released by the Patriots.

Minnesota Vikings
On October 25, 2016, Thompson was signed to the Vikings' practice squad. He was released by the Vikings on November 26, 2016 and was re-signed again to the practice squad on December 5, 2016. He signed a reserve/futures contract with the Vikings on January 2, 2017. On May 4, 2017, he was waived by the Vikings.

Cincinnati Bengals
On July 31, 2017, Thompson signed with the Cincinnati Bengals. He was waived on August 19, 2017.

Retirement
On May 13, 2018, he announced his retirement from professional football in a YouTube video on his channel.

Personal life

On July 13, 2016 Thompson married his college sweetheart Charlotte Annabelle Paguyo, whom he met while attending the University of Minnesota, in Minneapolis. On Thursday August 3, 2017, the Thompsons welcomed daughter Madeline Parker Thompson. The family currently resides in Minneapolis.

Thompson is the brother of Tedric Thompson, who was drafted by the Seattle Seahawks in the 2017 NFL Draft who last played for the Cleveland Browns.

Thompson has a YouTube channel that he started on September 29, 2016 called asCEDbyme; In which he focuses on family, faith, football, & film.

References

1993 births
Living people
People from Imperial County, California
American football safeties
Minnesota Golden Gophers football players
Miami Dolphins players
New England Patriots players
Minnesota Vikings players
Cincinnati Bengals players